

White Island is an uninhabited white sandbar located about  off the northern shore of Mambajao in the volcanic island of Camiguin in the Philippines.  The island is generally horseshoe shaped, although the tides constantly resize and reshape its exact form.   There are no trees or shelter of any kind, and it is composed solely of white sands.

Accessibility
White Island attracts thousands of tourists every year. The island can be accessed from Barangay Agoho or Brgy. Small boats can be hired from any of the beachfront resorts that face the island.

Gallery

See also

 List of islands of the Philippines
 List of islands
 Desert island

References

Uninhabited islands of the Philippines
Islands of Camiguin